Domenico Fontanella (born 6 February 1949) is a former Italian long jumper.

Career
Two-time national champion at senior level in long jump in 1970 and 1975.

References

External links
 

1949 births
Living people
Italian male long jumpers